Ovadia Hedaya (24 December 1889 – 8 February 1969) was a leading Israeli rabbi.

Biography
Rabbi Hadaya was born in 1889 in Aleppo, Ottoman Syria, to rabbi Shalom Hedaya. In 1945, he succeeded his father as head of Yeshivat HaMekubalim, the center of kabbalistic study in Jerusalem.

Awards and honours
 In 1968, Rabbi Hedaya was awarded the Israel Prize, in Rabbinical literature.

Published works

Yaskil Avdi: (Eight volumes)

See also
List of Israel Prize recipients

References

1889 births
1969 deaths
Orthodox rabbis in Mandatory Palestine
Israeli Orthodox rabbis
Religious Zionist Orthodox rabbis
Israel Prize Rabbi recipients
Israel Prize in Rabbinical literature recipients
Rabbis in Jerusalem